Baqa may refer to:

Baka, Jerusalem, neighborhood in Jerusalem
Baqa al-Gharbiyye, Arab city in Israel
Baqa ash-Sharqiyya, Palestinian town in West Bank
Baqat al-Hatab, Palestinian village in West Bank
Baqa'a refugee camp, an UNRWA Palestine refugee camp near Amman, Jordan

See also
Baqaa
Bakkah